The Corlett–Hague rule is a rule in the economics of optimal taxation, which follows the second best approach, and states that optimal taxation can be achieved by taxing complementary goods of leisure, thereby reducing the distortion of labor supply incentives. It was developed by W.J. Corlett and D.C. Hague in 1953, and is derived from the principles of optimal taxation derived by Frank P. Ramsey. The Corlett–Hague rule has multiple applications in tax policy such as in commodity taxation or capital income taxation.

References
 Corlett, W.J., Hague, D.C. (1953). "Complementarity and the Excess Burden of Taxation." Review of Economic Studies, 21(1), pp. 21–30.

Public economics
Taxation and redistribution
Theory of taxation